Falconara Albanese is an Arbëreshë town and comune in the province of Cosenza in the Calabria region of southern Italy. It is home to the Arbëresh minority.

References

Arbëresh settlements
Cities and towns in Calabria